KVGK-LP (97.9 FM) is a radio station licensed to serve Las Vegas, Nevada. The station, founded by Gregory LaPorta, was established in 2010, is owned by Las Vegas Public Radio Inc. and affiliated with Feature Story News (FSN), T-Mobile, the Las Vegas Tribune (a division of Tribune Media Group), Syndication Networks and Public News Service (PNS). Portsonic Communications, LLC is a local community radio investor and management company for Las Vegas Public Radio Inc. KVGK-LP is governed under the Local Community Radio Act of 2010 as a public radio station to the Las Vegas, Nevada valley.

KVGK-LP generates programming locally in Las Vegas, Nevada. The station began broadcasting on January 9, 2016, with the call sign KIOF-LP. KVGK-LP can be heard on 97.9 FM throughout the Las Vegas and North Las Vegas metropolitan areas as well as the Las Vegas Strip, T-Mobile Arena and Las Vegas Chinatown.

Las Vegas Public Radio Inc. is an independent State of Nevada Public Broadcaster, and is part of the State of Nevada Public Broadcasting System.

On September 4, 2022, Las Vegas Public Radio Inc. returned the broadcast license of the then-KIOF-LP along with the call letters back to the FCC. Las Vegas Public Radio Inc. is in the process of building its new 48,000 Watt FM radio station on KQQY (90.1 FM) as authorized through a construction permit issued by the FCC on June 9, 2022.

History
This station received its original construction permit from the Federal Communications Commission on September 5, 2014. The new station was assigned the KIOF-LP call sign by the FCC on September 12, 2014. KIOF-LP began over-the-air program tests on January 9, 2016, and received its license to cover from the FCC on February 1, 2016.

In June 2018, KIOF-LP Las Vegas Public Radio Inc. officially became part of the State of Nevada Public Broadcasting System.

On June 9, 2022, the Federal Communications Commission issued a construction permit to Las Vegas Public Radio Inc. for a new station to operate on 90.1 FM and broadcast at 48,000 watts. The KIOF-LP license was deleted on September 6, 2022, in order to make way for KQQY to launch at 90.1 FM. The FCC reinstated KIOF-LP's license on November 3, 2022. The station changed its call sign to KVGK-LP on March 10, 2023.

References

External links
 

VGK-LP
Radio stations established in 2016
VGK-LP
Clark County, Nevada
2016 establishments in Nevada